Eurysthenes (c. 400 BC) was a descendant of the Spartan king Demaratus. 

After his deposition in 491 BC, Demaratus had fled to Persia, where king Darius I made him ruler of the cities of Pergamon, Teuthrania and Halisarna. About a hundred years later Eurysthenes and his brother Procles reigned over the same cities; their joint rule is at least attested for the year 399 BC.

Notes

References 

 Benedikt Niese: Eurysthenes 4). In: Realencyclopädie der Classischen Altertumswissenschaft. Vol. VI, 1 (1907), col. 1353-1354.

5th-century BC births
4th-century BC deaths
4th-century BC Spartans
4th-century BC rulers
Rulers in the Achaemenid Empire
Ancient Greeks from the Achaemenid Empire
Eurypontid dynasty